Joshua Portway (born 1967) is an artist and game designer. He is a frequent collaborator with Lise Autogena, for example on their Black Shoals stock market. He is also the author of the Noodle  series of interactive music pieces, which was originally created as a part of larger world music project at Peter Gabriel's Real World Multimedia studio. Although the main project didn't see the light of day, Noodle was released as an interactive track on a number of Real World CDs, and later evolved into Noodle Heaven.

By 1984, he had written and published the game "Sim" for the BBC Micro and Acorn Electron, which reached number 2 in the charts in 1985.

In 2002 he was nominated (along with Lise Autogena) for the Alternative Turner Prize.
He is the son of the artist Douglas Portway, and brother of actor and musician Saskia Portway.

External links
personal website
artist page at the-artists.org
Black Shoals Project
Sound Mirrors Project 
Tate Britain
Noodle Heaven
Original Noodle Website
Sim, for the BBC Micro

1967 births
British installation artists
Living people
British video game designers
British video game programmers